"Both Sides Now" is the twenty-fourth episode and season finale of the fifth season of House. It originally aired on May 11, 2009.

Plot
House wakes up at his apartment after spending the night with Cuddy. He discovers that she has left her lipstick on his bathroom counter, as well as on his cheek. House pockets the lipstick, and goes to work in a cheerful mood and a remarkable lack of pain.

House and the team are intrigued by Scott (Ashton Holmes), a man who has undergone a corpus callosotomy procedure to treat epilepsy. The procedure left him with independently functioning left and right brain hemispheres and two distinct personalities, resulting in loss of conscious control over some of his actions, including those of his left hand, a condition known as alien hand syndrome.

As the two sides of Scott's brain struggle for dominance, his warring personalities make it increasingly difficult for the team to figure out what is causing the problem. The team is forced to use some unusual methods to get him to cooperate with their  testing.

Meanwhile, Cuddy tells House that their relationship must be that of employer and employee. House tells Wilson that he kicked his drug habit and had sex with Cuddy; Wilson advises that he talk to her, advice which House ignores. Instead he begins a campaign to annoy and provoke her, an attempt to break through her composure.

When, as part of this plan, House refuses to make his scheduled appearances in the clinic, Cuddy begins referring patients to see House in his private office, specifically an annoying elderly man named Eugene Schwartz (guest star Carl Reiner) whose wife is bothered by the odd "squawking" noises he makes.

To Chase's complaints about his relationship crisis with Cameron, Taub responds by talking about toxic chemicals of male fruit flies. Meanwhile, Cameron turns to House for advice, who convinces her to concede to Chase. Chase gets a new point of view of her motives and concedes to her in turn. Their wedding plans are revived.

In a final attempt to provoke Cuddy into examining her true feelings for him, House announces to everyone in the main lobby of the hospital that the two had sex. Cuddy responds by confronting him and then firing him after he suggests that they move in together. Cuddy storms off but before House can do anything else, Eugene Schwartz approaches to inquire about his squawking condition again.

House initially diagnoses it as acid reflux causing his vocal cords to tense, but when Schwartz adjusts his belt due to soreness, House realizes Schwartz has pancreatic cancer, which was the root cause of the acid reflux. At the same time, it is reported that the patient with alien hand syndrome, Scott, is really suffering from a reaction to an ingredient in the industrial-strength antiperspirant he uses.

House then goes to talk to Cuddy in her office, and asks her if she could possibly be overreacting to the previous night. She finally admits that maybe she is, since he's "said plenty of lousy things to [her] before." House seems confused, as he assumed that she was overreacting to her and House having sex and what it could mean to their employer-employee relationship.

But he realizes that Cuddy's reactions all day have been consistent, and in fact it is his own memory of the situation that is faulty. He turns his attention to the lipstick Cuddy left at his apartment, which he has been playing with all day, and is troubled that Cuddy's coffee cup shows no lipstick smears; his memory of the prior evening included smears of lipstick on his face from kissing Cuddy, so he expects her lipstick is the sort that smears. He asks Cuddy whether she has another type of lipstick, one with a "sealing agent", that might explain the discrepancy between his memory of the smeared kiss and the reality that now confronts him of the unsmeared coffee cup.

House then has a flashback to the night (from the episode "Under My Skin") before when he thought he told Cuddy that he needed her help with his addiction. He suddenly sees the reality of what has happened: he never told Cuddy he was having hallucinations that night. His final words of the evening were: "You can go suckle the little bastard child if that makes you feel good about yourself." Upset by this remark, she left the office and went home, never accompanying him to his apartment.

House snaps back to reality and tries to explain to Cuddy that that's not what actually happened, saying "I told you I needed you, and you helped me." He reaches into his pocket to remove the lipstick, but, to his shock, he discovers that it is actually a bottle of Oxycodone. He drops the bottle on the floor and gingerly backs away from it. Cuddy, now realizing House is not joking, rushes to him and asks if he is okay.  He doesn't respond, but then has another flashback, and realizes what happened. The whole previous night was a complete hallucination, beginning from him telling Cuddy that he needed her to help him detox and her accompanying him home. His memory of Cuddy staying by his side at his apartment was not real, and, in fact, he spent the night popping pills by himself. Hallucinations of Amber and Kutner then appear and tell House that while the story he invented about himself is nice, it's not true. House finally looks at Cuddy and is able to fearfully tell her that he is not okay.

Cuddy goes to Wilson's office, and looks troubled upon entering. House then follows, visibly terrified, prompting Wilson to abruptly stand up, realizing what has happened. The last scene cross cuts between shots of Cameron and Chase's wedding and Wilson driving House to Mayfield Psychiatric Hospital. The rest of the Princeton-Plainsboro team happily looks on at the wedding, while House and Wilson share a poignant, silent goodbye.

Production
Although Mayfield Psychiatric Hospital is fictitious, the building into which House is admitted was a psychiatric hospital in New Jersey, Greystone Park Psychiatric Hospital, which was abandoned and eventually demolished in 2015.  Some filming also occurred there for the sixth season.

Music
 The song Scott's left hand plays air guitar to is "China Grove" by The Doobie Brothers.
 The song that plays during the final scene is "As Tears Go By" by The Rolling Stones and The Vitamin String Quartet.

See also
 Chlorotoxin

Notes

External links

House (season 5) episodes
2009 American television episodes

fr:La Stratégie de l'inconscient